Montenegro competed at the 2016 Winter Youth Olympics in Lillehammer, Norway from 12 to 21 February 2016.

Alpine skiing

Boys

Girls

See also
Montenegro at the 2016 Summer Olympics

References

2016 in Montenegrin sport
Nations at the 2016 Winter Youth Olympics
Montenegro at the Youth Olympics